Madan Singh Chauhan (born 15 October, 1947) also known as "Guruji" is a Folk & Sufi Singer from Raipur, Chhattisgarh, India. In 2020,he received the Padma Shri honour from the Government of India for his contribution in the field of Art.

Life 

Madan Singh Chauhan devoted his entire life to music practice. He Started his career with Dholak and then he spent 30 years using the tabla.

References 

Living people
Recipients of the Padma Shri in arts
1947 births